Milpuc District is one of twelve districts of the province Rodríguez de Mendoza in Peru.

References

Districts of the Rodríguez de Mendoza Province
Districts of the Amazonas Region